Jacco Eltingh was the defending champion, but lost in the first round to Richey Reneberg.

Michael Chang won the title by defeating Todd Martin 6–7(4–7), 7–6(7–4), 6–0 in the final.

Seeds

Draw

Finals

Top half

Bottom half

References

External links
 Official results archive (ATP)
 Official results archive (ITF)

Singles
1994 Singles